Manitoba Provincial Road 466 is a very short north-south provincial road in the southwestern section of the Canadian province of Manitoba.

Route description 

PR 466 is a north-south provincial road that begins at PR 465 near the unincorporated community of Cordova, and travels to its northbound terminus with the Yellowhead Highway near Franklin. 

PR 466 is a gravel road for its entire length.

History 
In the early 1990s, the Manitoba government decommissioned a number of provincial secondary roads and returned the maintenance of these roads back to the rural municipalities. A large portion of the original PR 466 was included in this decommissioning.

From this point, it traveled north through Franklin and terminated at a junction with PR 471.

In 1984, PR 466 was extended further north to the unincorporated community of Mountain Road, where it terminated at PR 357. The section of the extension between Mountain Road and PR 265 had previously been designated as PR 562, which was decommissioned and transferred to the new number.

This section is now a municipal road.

References

External links 
Manitoba Official Map - Southwest
 

466